Hanagasa Ondo (花笠音頭) is a folk song from Yamagata Prefecture, Japan. The name literally means "flower straw-hat song." It accompanies a local community dance called the "Hanagasa Odori." (花笠踊り)

The song is in typical swung ondo rhythm, and features a kakegoe found in no other song; "Ha Yassho Makkasho!" The dance is performed with a simple straw hat decorated with synthetic flowers. It is usually performed by women, but men can also join in. The dance movements are different for each gender.

Excerpt from Hanagasa Ondo 

Japanese:

Oraga zaisho ni
kite miyashanse
kome no CHOI CHOI! (kakegoe)
naruki ga ojigi suru
Ha Yassho! Makkasho! Shan Shan Shan!

English translation:

Oh come here and see
The heads of rice have matured
And bow low with fruit
(kakegoe)

In popular culture

Hanagasa Ondo plays when the lid of the Gyukakuni ekiben is lifted.

Japanese folk songs
Japanese-language songs
Year of song unknown
Songwriter unknown